Francisco de Murga y Ortiz de Orué (1570? – 1636) was Spanish soldier and engineer who became Governor and Captain-General of Cartagena.
He was governor of Marmora in Africa when he was appointed to fortify the plaza of Cartagena.  He was a knight of Order of Santiago. 
He died in 1636.

Governor of Cartagena

Murga was governor of Cartagena from 1629 until his death in 1636, replacing García Girón de Loayza.

Defense

The town was constantly under threat from Dutch privateers, and during his term of office Murga strengthened the eastern fortifications.
He ignored the work and views of the Italian engineer Cristóbal de Roda Antonelli, who had spent many years working on the fortifications.
With experience in Flanders, Murga wanted to apply the principles of fortification that had been developed there, including opposing trenches and advanced Ravelins to hinder the approach of the enemy.
In 1631 he used prisoners from the Anglo-French colonies of Nevis and Saint Kitts to fortify the bridge connecting the city with the Getsemaní suburb, building a Media Luna (half moon) gatehouse.
This structure, with its unusual concave crescent wall, made it possible to instantly cut off the city from any approach from the mainland.

Based on his work on the fortifications, which included surrounding the city with heavy curtain walls, Murga has been called the master builder of the walled city of Cartagena, the "Marquis de las Murallas" (Marquis of the Walls).

Providence Island

The Providence Island colony was established by the English in 1630 on an island called Santa Catalina by the Spanish, now Isla de Providencia, to the east of what is now Nicaragua.
A Puritan settlement, it became a base for privateers attacking Spanish shipping.
The Spanish did not hear of the colony until 1635, when they captured some Englishmen in Portobelo, on the Isthmus of Panama.
Francisco de Murga dispatched Captain Gregorio de Castellar y Mantilla and engineer Juan de Somovilla Texada to destroy the colony.  
The Spanish fleet anchored outside New Westminster in July 1635, and Castellar sent a messenger to demand the surrender of Providence island. Governor Philip Bell refused. The Spanish launched an attack at a poorly defended point, but were repelled by gunfire from the heights and were forced to retreat "in haste and disorder".
In October 1635, Murga sent Castellar and Somovilla to attack the "Ysla de Mosquitos" on which more English were said to have established a base, 
but they were not able to locate the island.

Maroon problem

Murga had to deal with the problem of Cimarrones or Maroons, escaped slaves from Africa who had established independent settlements in the Cartagena region, who had been raiding and killing Indians and Spanish settlers.  
There were at least eight Maroon palenques, or illegal settlements, in the region.
In 1631 Murga sent an expedition against a palenque "next to the Rio Grande of the Magdalena".
They found it abandoned, and burned it down.
In 1633 Murga attempted peace negotiations with the Palenque of Limón.
When negotiations broke down, On 9 December 1633, Spanish soldiers attacked Limón, capturing more than eighty residents and after a trial executing thirteen, whose bodies were quartered and displayed publicly.
The testimony of the Maroons at their trial was recorded in a 990-page dossier sent to King Philip IV of Spain, a valuable historical document.

Quarrels with the inquisition

As governor of Cartagena, Francisco de Murga was determined to curb the power of the inquisitors. He was widely supported by the population, to whom the inquisition was deeply unpopular. He became involved in particularly bitter quarrels with the inquisitor Vélez de Asas y Argos. He was described by the inquisitors in a letter of 12 December 1632 as the most dangerous man on earth, constantly harassing them. One day he released a negro who was being whipped through the streets for heresy. The inquisitors excommunicated him. He jailed the officials sent to notify him of this, holding them for 24 hours.

Eventually Murga asked for absolution, but when this was administered in a humiliating manner the Council of the Indies formally complained to the king. Although Velez y Argos was ordered to appear before a council in Madrid to answer Murga's accusations. The council hesitated to take drastic action for fear this would encourage other governors to curtail the authority of inquisitors, preventing them from doing their duty. Murga's death helped remove the problem, but the council recommended to the king that Velez y Argos not be allowed to return to Cartagena, and the king agreed. Eventually Asas y Argos was transferred to the Tribunal de México, in April 1637.

References
Citations

Sources

 

 

1636 deaths
17th-century Spanish people
Colonial Colombia
Year of birth unknown